Empem Dacosta ( born 23 June 1997) is a Ghanaian professional footballer who plays as a defender for Ghanaian Premier League side Ashanti Gold.

Career 
Dacosta played for Aiyinase-based Karela United helping them to gain promotion into the Ghana Premier League in 2017. He served as captain of the club. He moved to Asante Kotoko in July 2019, signing a 3-year deal ahead of the 2019–20 Ghana Premier League season. He was the third player to move from Karela to Kotoko within a period of one year, along with Maxwell Baakoh and Ismail Abdul-Ganiyu. He played 6 matches for the club before the league was put on hold and later cancelled due to the COVID-19 pandemic. After 13 months into his contract, the contract was terminated by the club. He subsequently came out to say in a radio interview that he was not bitter about the club's decision.

Ashanti Gold 
Dacosta was signed by Ashanti Gold in September 2020 on a three-year deal ahead of the 2020–21 Ghana Premier League along with the club's bid to bolster their squad ahead of the 2020–21 CAF Confederation Cup.

References

External links 

 

Living people
1997 births
Association football defenders
Ghanaian footballers
Ghana Premier League players
Karela United FC players
Asante Kotoko S.C. players
Ashanti Gold SC players